August Helge "Ekis" Ekroth (26 February 1892 – 29 November 1950) was a Swedish football (soccer) and bandy player. He competed in the 1912 Summer Olympics, playing as forward in one match in the main tournament. He won the Swedish league four times (1911, 1914, 1916 and 1923), making him the only football player in AIK with four national league titles. He scored 10 goals in 18 international games for Sweden.

References

External links
 Swedish squad in 1912 

1892 births
1950 deaths
Swedish footballers
Swedish bandy players
Sweden international footballers
AIK Fotboll players
AIK Bandy players
Olympic footballers of Sweden
Footballers at the 1912 Summer Olympics

Association football forwards